Amadou Jawo (born 29 September 1984) is a Gambian footballer who plays as a striker for Brottby SK in Sweden.

Career
Jawo was born in Banjul, Gambia. He arrived in Sweden at the age of five and after settling down in Täby kyrkby he joined the local club IK Frej. When he was sixteen he made his first team debut for Vallentuna BK in Division 1. During his time at the club he scored 9 goals in 56 games.

At the end of 2007 Jawo trialed with Djurgårdens IF. He played two games for the Stockholm club but did not end up getting signed. In the second game where Djurgården played against Gefle IF he however impressed Gefle manager Per Olsson enough to be signed by the Gävle club instead.
After two successful seasons at Gefle IF he was sold to IF Elfsborg in what was one of the most lucrative deals in the history of the club.

Jawo struggled to break into the starting eleven at Elfsborg and declared at the end of 2011 that he would not accept being a bench player for another year. The new Djurgården manager Magnus Pehrsson tried to bring Jawo to his club during several transfer windows and finally in March 2013 he joined them on a season long loan. In January 2014, Djurgården announced that Jawo had signed a 5-year contract, keeping him at the club through 2018.

On 23 April 2019, Jawo joined Brottby SK.

Personal life
Jawo is of Gambian descent. He was a Djurgårdens IF supporter when he was growing up. He has a total of nine siblings. His brother Omar Jawo has played 89 games in the Swedish top tier Allsvenskan while another brother, Momodou Jawo, was a goalkeeper for IK Frej.

Career statistics

Honors

Club
 IF Elfsborg
 Allsvenskan (1): 2012

Individual 
 Årets Järnkamin (1): 2013

References

External links
 
 

1984 births
Living people
Sportspeople from Banjul
Gambian emigrants to Sweden
Naturalized citizens of Sweden
Swedish footballers
Association football forwards
Gefle IF players
IF Elfsborg players
Djurgårdens IF Fotboll players
IK Frej players
Allsvenskan players
Swedish people of Gambian descent